Alexander was launched in 1800 at Hull, or actually further up the River Ouse at Selby, and probably under another name. From 1807 on she was a West Indiaman. She was wrecked on 19 May 1820 while sailing to Honduras.

Career
Alexander first entered Lloyd's Register (LR) in 1807.

Lloyd's List reported in August 1807 that Alexander, Atkins, master, had recaptured the sloop Albion, of Bermuda, and taken her into Jamaica. Albion had been sailing from Havana to Savannah with a cargo of coffee when a  French privateer had captured her.

Loss
Alexander was wrecked on 19 May 1820 in the Southern Four Keys (Lighthouse Reef). She was on a voyage from London to Jamaica and British Honduras. Most of her cargo was saved, but in a damaged state.

Citations

1800 ships
Age of Sail merchant ships of England
Maritime incidents in May 1820